Mansfield Museum is a local authority museum run by the council in Mansfield, Nottinghamshire. The brainchild of William Edward Baily, a wealthy local collector and natural historian, the museum opened in 1904 after Baily offered his collection and a building, the 'Tin Tabernacle', to Mansfield.

Background
Originally called the "Tin Tabernacle", the Museum was given to the town of Mansfield by the wealthy collector and natural historian, William Edward Baily in 1903. On his death he donated his collection and the building to house it. The following year the Museum was opened to the public on its current site on Leeming Street.  Other prominent local people also added to the collection, including naturalist Joseph Whitaker and artist Albert Sorby Buxton.

The building you see today replaced the deteriorating "Tin Tabernacle" in 1938 and a fourth gallery was added in the 1960s. The arcade gallery was opened by the Duchess of York in 1989 and this finally took the building out onto the road. A major 1990's development provided state-of-the-art storage facilities and an education room.

The most recent addition to the Museum has been the XplorActive hands-on environmental gallery.

Current work
As well as the many permanent and temporary exhibitions the Museum hosts a number of community projects, these are aimed at all sections of society.
In 2011 the Museum was recognised as The Guardian Family Friendly Museum of the Year.

The Museum is focused on working with groups across the community and providing  a child-friendly atmosphere to encourage visits by younger people and their carers. Changing exhibitions aimed at all sectors of local society aim to keep the Museum a relevant player in Mansfield's cultural life.

The museum provides a range of educational activities, including the XplorActive exhibition and ArtBeat, a holiday workshop for children.

Permanent exhibitions
The Museum's permanent displays illustrate the social and industrial history of the district using objects and photographs. A significant collection of eighteenth century porcelain, including pieces from Derby, Pinxton and Mansfield is always on show, and a collection of Albert Sorby Buxton's watercolours takes visitors back to Mansfield at the turn of the century.

Made in Mansfield
The Museum arcade holds an exhibition on eight of the more well-known industries that built Mansfield's reputation for manufacturing. The gallery features artefacts, photos, film and audio relating to the major, past and present employers of the town: Metal Box, Shoe Co, Mansfield Brewery, Barrs Soft Drinks, hosiery, precision engineering, mining, foundries and quarrying.

Albert Sorby Buxton
A real jewel in the crown of the collection are the watercolour pictures of Mansfield painted by artist Albert Sorby Buxton. The pictures highlight buildings in Mansfield that no longer exist and views that have long since disappeared.

Ceramics
A gallery is dedicated to the ceramic works of William Billingsley and Rachel Manner's lustreware

External links
 Mansfield Museum
 Mansfield Museum Facebook Page
  XplorActive - museum's site for games for children, and a hands-on interactive gallery in the museum

Art museums and galleries in Nottinghamshire
Museums in Nottinghamshire
Local museums in Nottinghamshire
Buildings and structures in Mansfield
Museums established in 1903